Taxodium ascendens, also known as pond cypress, is a deciduous conifer of the genus Taxodium, native to North America. Many botanists treat it as a variety of bald cypress, Taxodium distichum (as T. distichum var. imbricatum) rather than as a distinct species, but it differs in habitat, occurring mainly in still blackwater rivers, ponds and swamps without silt-rich flood deposits. It predominates in cypress dome habitats.

Description
Taxodium ascendens reaches on average  in height. Compared to T. distichum, the leaves are shorter (3–10 mm long), slenderer and are on shoots that tend to be erect rather than spreading. The trunk is expanded at the base, even on young trees, assisting the tree in anchoring in the soft, muddy soil. The cones also tend to be smaller, not over 2.5 cm diameter. The bark is also a paler gray color. Like bald cypresses, pond cypresses growing in water have a characteristic growth trait called cypress knees; these are woody projections called 'pneumatophores', which are sent above the water from the roots.

Distribution
This species is native to the southeastern United States, from southeastern Virginia to southeastern Louisiana and south into Florida except for the Florida Keys.

Stunted individuals of pond cypress are notable in the dwarf cypress savanna of the Everglades National Park.

Habitat

Taxodium ascendens occurs naturally in shallow ponds, lake margins, swamps and wetlands.

References

 Flora of North America (as T. distichum var. imbricarium)
 Floridata
 :File:The Senator Tree Longwood Florida.JPG

External links

ascendens
Trees of the Southeastern United States
Plants used in bonsai
Trees of the United States
Deciduous conifers